Miquel Travé Pujal (born 6 January 2000) is a Spanish slalom canoeist who has competed at the international level since 2016.

Trave won a silver medal in the C1 team event at the 2019 ICF Canoe Slalom World Championships in La Seu d'Urgell. He also won two bronze medals at the 2022 European Championships in Liptovský Mikuláš.

Trave won four medals at the Junior World Championships, with one gold (C1: 2018) and three silver (C1: 2017, K1 team: 2017, C1 team: 2017).

At the 2018 European Junior and U23 Canoe Slalom Championships in Bratislava, Trave won both the K1 and C1 events in the junior category. He was the first male paddler in history to win both the K1 and C1 events at the same international level event. Miquel finished third in the overall standings of the 2021 World Cup, after winning the third round on his home course in La Seu d'Urgell.

Results

World Cup individual podiums

Complete World Cup results

Notes
No overall rankings were determined by the ICF, with only two races possible due to the COVID-19 pandemic.

Complete Championship Results

References

External links

Living people
2000 births
Place of birth missing (living people)
Spanish male canoeists
21st-century Spanish people